Sarungal (Kites) is a 2018 Sri Lankan Sinhala drama, romantic film directed by Nalaka Vithanage and co-produced by Tharanga Athuraliya and A. Parister for Niro Films. It stars Charith Abeysinghe and newcomer Chamathka Lakmini in lead roles along with Saranga Disasekara and Soorya Dayaruwan.  Music composed by Ranga Dasanayake. It is the 1317th Sri Lankan film in the Sinhala cinema.

The film received mixed reviews from critics.

Plot
A young girl Asanki (Chamathka) spending the night in a nightclub. Amila (Charith) is a young man looking at Asanki. Unbeknownst to Amila, Asanki too, been sighed and sat next to her. Asanki is in the midst of a tough situation about her marital relationship with Bhanuka (Saranga). Amila is also in a similar situation with his wife Duleeka (Shalika). The two shared their sadness. Amila was deeply moved by Asanki's tears. Asanki also understood Amila's heart and consoled him by turning it into his own. The two began a journey without purpose. They reached the Fort Railway Station and boarded a train bound for Badulla. They stayed at a hotel. Then they found a house to stay. They used their credit cards to pay for it.

When money start to used up, they seek jobs in Kandy. After few days, both found jobs with reasonable salary. However after few days they start a lusty relationship and start to live together. However, with the life tends to be normal and regular, they saw the dissimilarities between them. After many heated verbal conversations, they revealed that both are married, even though they never knew it. Finally it was revealed that Asanki's husband is the owner of the company where Amila's wife worked.

Cast
 Charith Abeysinghe as Milinda
 Chamathka Lakmini as Asanki
 Saranga Disasekara as Bhanuka, Asanki's husband
 Shalika Edirisinghe as Duleeka, Milinda's wife
 Janaka Ranasinghe as Home selling man
 Chinthaka Peiris as Manager
 Suneth Malsiripura
 Julia Kaluarachchi
 Sachithra Yashminda as Heshan
 Tashin Maduka as Pickpocket boy
 Soorya Dayaruwan in uncredited role

References

External links
 
 Sarungal on YouTube

2010s Sinhala-language films
2018 films